Benito Montalvo (born September 19, 1985 in Unquillo) is an Argentine coach, in December 2020 signed as assistant coach with Manolo Marquez in Hyderabad FC from Indian Super League, in July 2020 was head coach in RCD Espanyol Academy Helsinki and ex footballer who last played for Vilassar de Mar in the 1º Catalana in Spain. The formation he did in Barcelona in Marcet Academy as a coach, analyst and sport director.

External links 
 Profile at BDFA
 

Argentine footballers
Argentine expatriate footballers
Instituto footballers
Association football midfielders
Sportspeople from Córdoba Province, Argentina